Oliver Avenue Bridge was a historic railroad bridge located at Middletown in Orange County, New York.  It was built in 1895 by the Havana Bridge Works.  It was a single span, metal trough Pratt truss structure measuring 20 feet wide and 105 feet long. The bridge has been demolished.

It was listed on the National Register of Historic Places in 1984.

References

Railroad bridges in New York (state)
Railroad bridges on the National Register of Historic Places in New York (state)
Bridges completed in 1895
Bridges in Orange County, New York
National Register of Historic Places in Orange County, New York
Metal bridges in the United States
Pratt truss bridges in the United States